Fatemeh Masoudifar is an Iranian actress. She made her feature film debut in fantasy horror Skin (2020) for which she earned a Hafez Award nomination. She is best known for her role as Sara Gorji in historical romance Jeyran (2022).

Early life and career 
Fatemeh Masoudifar was born in Tabriz, Iran. She studied English literature at Tabriz University and began performing in school plays during that time.

Masoudifar's first experience of film acting came when she played the female lead in Skin (2020), which was directed by Bahram and Bahman Ark and first released at the Fajr Film Festival. She was chosen for the role after one of the directors saw her perform in a theatre production. Masoudifar has since appeared in the historical series Jeyran, portraying the wife of Naser al-Din Shah. She does theatre activities on the side.

Filmography

Film

Web

Theatre

Awards and nominations

References

External links 

 

Living people
21st-century Iranian actresses
Iranian film actresses
Iranian stage actresses
Iranian television actresses
People from Tabriz
Year of birth missing (living people)